Command and Staff College may refer to:
Air Command and Staff College, Maxwell Air Force Base, Montgomery, Alabama
Armed Forces Command and Staff College, Jaji, Nigeria
Armed Forces of the Philippines Command and General Staff College
Army Command and Staff College, Fort Queenscliff, Victoria (Australia)
Australian Command and Staff College, Weston Creek, Canberra
Canadian Army Command and Staff College, Fort Frontenac, Ontario
College of Naval Command and Staff, Newport, Rhode Island
Defence Services Command and Staff College, Sri Lanka
Fouad Shehab Command and Staff College, Lebanon
IDF Command and Staff College, Israel
Joint Services Command and Staff College, Oxfordshire, United Kingdom
Marine Corps Command and Staff College, Quantico, Virginia
Namibia Command and Staff College, Okahandja, Namibia
Pakistan Command and Staff College, Quetta
Singapore Command and Staff College 
Uganda Senior Command and Staff College, Kimaka, Jinja
United States Army Command and General Staff College, Fort Leavenworth, Kansas

See also
Staff College
War college